Complete Wellbeing was a personal growth magazine founded in 2006. It was published from Mumbai, India, and distributed all over the country. It stopped publishing its print edition with its June 2016 issue. It continues to publish content on its website.

History and profile
Complete Wellbeing was first published on 1 November 2006. The magazine promotes the idea that individuals are not sum of parts but an integrated whole. In other words, one's mind, body and soul must work in harmony to feel well. It highlights the inter-connectedness of an individual's physical, mental, emotional and spiritual aspects. The magazine targets both men and women.

In 2012 Complete Wellbeing received the Medscape India Award for excellence in media for wellbeing.

References

External links
 Official website

2006 establishments in Maharashtra
English-language magazines published in India
Health magazines
Monthly magazines published in India
Magazines about spirituality
Magazines established in 2006
Mass media in Mumbai